The New York Film Critics Online Award for Best Supporting Actress is an award given annually by the New York Film Critics Online. It was first introduced in 2001 to reward the best performance by a supporting actor.

Winners

2000s

2010s

Winners

2020s

See also
 Los Angeles Film Critics Association Award for Best Supporting Actress
 National Board of Review Award for Best Supporting Actress
 New York Film Critics Circle Award for Best Supporting Actress
 National Society of Film Critics Award for Best Supporting Actress

External links
 www.nyfco.net

References

Film awards for supporting actress
Awards established in 2001